Adam Weisman (born July 29, 1986) is an American actor and mortician probably best known for his role as Steve Haley in Rob Zombie's Halloween.

Filmography
Halloween (2007) as Steven "Steve" Haley
Hatchet (2006) as Halloween Skeleton
In Justice(TV series) as Martin Lewiki (2006, one episode)
Over There (TV series) as Kid in Airplane (2005, one episode)
Desperate Housewives (TV series) as Ian (2004, one episode)
7th Heaven (1998–2007) (TV series) as Andrew (2004, one episode)
Toolbox Murders (2004) as Austin Sterling
Little Man on Campus (2000) as Archie
Roswell as Preteen Boy Tourist (1999, one episode)
The Visitor (1998) as Young Kid #3
Bio-Dome (1996) as Young Bud

External links

 

1986 births
Living people
American male film actors